David Wayne Maxwell is a United States Marine Corps major general who serves as the commander of Marine Corps Installations Command since July 15, 2022. He most recently served as the Vice Director for Logistics of the Joint Staff from July 2020 to July 2021. Previously, he was the Assistant Deputy Commandant for Installations and Logistics (Plans, Policies and Strategic Mobility). Maxwell is a 1988 graduate of the United States Naval Academy.

References

External links

Year of birth missing (living people)
Living people
Place of birth missing (living people)
United States Naval Academy alumni
United States Marine Corps generals